The FINA/ARENA Swimming World Cup 2008 was held in October and November 2008. The meet scheduling matched that of the 2007 series, with all meets held short course metres (25 m) format.

The series winners were Cameron van der Burgh of South Africa and Marieke Guehrer of Australia.

Venues
The 2008 World Cup was staged at seven venues on five continents, with each meet following a heats and finals format for all events, with the exception of the 800 m and 1500 m freestyle and 400 m individual medley events which were heat-declared winners. The Brazil meet at Belo Horizonte was held as a three-day meet with evening heats and finals the following morning, with the remaining six meets being held over two days with morning heats and evening finals on each day. The order of events at each meet was the same.

Results

Overall World Cup
At each meet of the World Cup circuit in 2008, the FINA Points Table was used to rank all swim performances at the meet. The top 10 men and top 10 women were then be awarded World Cup points. Bonus points were awarded for a world record broken (20 points) or equalled (10 points). The number of World Cup points awarded were doubled for the final meet of the World Cup in Berlin.

The final rankings are shown below. Bonus points were awarded to eight swimmers for each of the twelve new world record standards set during the meets.

Men

Women

Event winners

50 m freestyle

100 m freestyle

200 m freestyle

400 m freestyle

1500 m (men) / 800 m (women) freestyle

50 m backstroke

100 m backstroke

200 m backstroke

50 m breaststroke

100 m breaststroke

200 m breaststroke

50 m butterfly

100 m butterfly

200 m butterfly

100 m individual medley

200 m individual medley

400 m individual medley

Legend:

See also
List of World Cup records in swimming
2008 in swimming

References

External links
FINA/ARENA Swimming World Cup 2008 Official Site
FINA's announcement of the 2008 schedule.

FINA Swimming World Cup
Fina Swimming World Cup, 2008